This is a list of people who have served as Custos Rotulorum of Shropshire.

 Thomas Holte bef. 1544–1546
 Thomas Bromley 1546–1555
 Humphrey Onslow bef. 1562 – aft. 1564
 George Bromley bef. 1573–1589
 Sir George Mainwaring bef. 1594–1596
 Sir Richard Leveson 1596–1605
 John Egerton, 1st Earl of Bridgewater 1605–1646
 Interregnum
 Francis Newport, 1st Earl of Bradford 1660–1708
 Richard Newport, 2nd Earl of Bradford 1708–1712
For later custodes rotulorum, see Lord Lieutenant of Shropshire.

References

Institute of Historical Research - Custodes Rotulorum 1544-1646
Institute of Historical Research - Custodes Rotulorum 1660-1828

Shropshire
History of Shropshire